Connecticut's 11th House of Representatives district elects one member of the Connecticut House of Representatives. It encompasses parts of the towns of East Hartford, Manchester, and South Windsor. It has been represented by Democrat Jeffrey Currey since 2015.

Recent Elections

2020

2018

2016

2014

2012

References

11